Desirée Rossit (born 19 March 1994) is an Italian athlete who specialises in the high jump. She competed in the 2016 Summer Olympics for Italy, qualifying for the finals and finishing 16th overall in the women's high jump.

Personal bests

Outdoor

Indoor

Achievements

See also
Italian all-time top lists - High jump

References

External links
 

1994 births
Living people
Italian female high jumpers
Athletes (track and field) at the 2016 Summer Olympics
Olympic athletes of Italy
Sportspeople from Udine
Athletics competitors of Fiamme Oro